Bhomolahati is a village in Kamrup rural district, in the state of Assam, India, situated in north bank of river Brahmaputra.

Transport
The village is located north of National Highway 15 and connected to nearby towns and cities like Baihata and Guwahati with regular buses and other modes of transportation.

See also
 Bihapara
 Barpalaha

References

Villages in Kamrup district